Colomba pasquale  or colomba di Pasqua  ("Easter Dove" in English) is an Italian traditional Easter bread, the counterpart of the two well-known Italian Christmas desserts, panettone and pandoro.

The dough for the colomba is made in a similar manner to panettone, with flour, eggs, sugar, natural yeast and butter; unlike panettone, it usually contains candied peel and no raisins. The dough is then fashioned into a dove shape (colomba in Italian) and finally is topped with pearl sugar and almonds before being baked. Some manufacturers produce other versions including a popular bread topped with chocolate.

The colomba was commercialised by the Milanese baker and businessman Angelo Motta as an Easter version of the Christmas speciality panettone that Motta foods were producing.

See also
Easter bread
 List of sweet breads

References

Sweet breads
Yeast breads
Easter bread
Italian breads
Italian desserts
Almond dishes
Easter traditions in Italy